Hans Binder (born 12 June 1948 in Zell am Ziller, Tyrol) is an Austrian former Formula One driver who raced for the Ensign, Wolf, Surtees and ATS teams.

He won the European Formula Ford Championship in 1972 and moved into Formula 2 in 1976. During this year he raced at his home Grand Prix and the Japanese GP. In 1977 he moved to the Surtees team and also raced three times for ATS. He then returned to Surtees before the end of the season. In 1978 he failed to qualify for his home Grand Prix with ATS before disappearing from the Formula One scene. He has since been in the family business Binderholz GmbH dealing in timber products.

His brother Franz was also a racing driver, and his nephew René started competing in the IndyCar Series in 2018.

Complete Formula One results
(key)

References

Profile at www.grandprix.com
https://www.youtube.com/watch?v=UkY-DNl8X0s

1948 births
Living people
Austrian racing drivers
Austrian Formula One drivers
ATS Wheels Formula One drivers
Ensign Formula One drivers
Wolf Formula One drivers
Surtees Formula One drivers
European Formula Two Championship drivers